Patricia Fox is an Australian religious, a member of the Congregation of Our Lady of Sion. She is known for her ejection from the Philippines by president Rodrigo Duterte. Prior to this, she was the National Coordinator of the Rural Missionaries of the Philippines.

Early life 
Fox was raised in the Box Hill area of Melbourne. In 1969, she joined the Sisters of Sion. In the 1980s Fox went to law school, and began helping in legal aid centers.

Vocation 

Fox moved to the Philippines in 1990, where she co-founded a congregation of Our Lady of Sion. She lived in the country for twenty-seven years, and served as mother superior of the congregation. Fox was concerned for the well-being of peasants and the urban poor. She has been quoted as saying, "The role of the religious is to be with those who are suffering, oppressed, to be with those who are asserting their rights." She joined the Rural Missionaries of the Philippines in 1991, became the Regional Coordinator for Central Luzon in 1998, then became the National Coordinator from 2000 until her departure from the Philippines.

Political concerns 
Fox was detained by the Philippine government on 16 April 2018 for questioning regarding her engagement in political activities. The investigation was initiated after she had joined a fact-finding mission to Mindanao in relation to human rights abuses under martial law. She was denounced by Philippine president Rodrigo Duterte. Fox left the country in November 2018. She currently lives in Melbourne, at the convent of Our Lady of Sion.

References 

Living people
20th-century Australian Roman Catholic nuns
21st-century Australian Roman Catholic nuns
21st-century Filipino Roman Catholic nuns
People from Melbourne
Year of birth missing (living people)